Croatia competed at the 2013 World Aquatics Championships in Barcelona, Spain between 19 July and 4 August 2013.

Medalists

Diving

Croatia qualified two quota places for the following diving events:

Women

Open water swimming

Croatia qualified a single quota in open water swimming:

Swimming

Croatian swimmers achieved qualifying standards in the following events (up to a maximum of 2 swimmers in each event at the A-standard entry time, and 1 at the B-standard):

Men

Women

Synchronized swimming

Croatia has qualified two synchronized swimmers.

Water polo

Men's tournament

Team roster

Josip Pavić
Luka Lončar
Ivan Milaković
Fran Paskvalin
Maro Joković
Luka Bukić
Petar Muslim
Andro Bušlje
Sandro Sukno
Nikša Dobud
Anđelo Šetka
Paulo Obradović
Marko Bijač

Group play

Round of 16

Quarterfinal
 
Semifinal

Third place game

References

External links
Barcelona 2013 Official Site
Croatian Swimming Federation

Nations at the 2013 World Aquatics Championships
2013 in Croatian sport
Croatia at the World Aquatics Championships